Peter Lipa (born May 30, 1943) is a Slovak singer, composer, and promoter of jazz. He has been called the Father of Slovak Jazz. Lipa  is regarded as the most significant figure in the Slovak jazz scene. He developed a unique vocal style that focused on the lyrics. His music is influenced by performers including Jimmy Rushing, Ray Charles, Al Jarreau, Joe Cocker, and Bobby McFerrin, and is a mix of jazz and blues. He was the first jazz singer to use Slovak.

Life and career
Lipa was born in Prešov to Hungarian parents and has worked in Czechoslovakia, the Czech Republic, and Slovakia. His roots are in blues, soul, and classical music and his work rock and jazz standards.

In 2003, he released an album called Beatles in Blue(s) with versions of sixteen songs by The Beatles. He and his arrangers and musicians intended to create the most unusual renditions they could imagine. Some songs, such as "Every Little Thing" and "I Wanna Be Your Man", are recorded so differently from the original versions that only the lyrics remain. In each case, the tempo, rhythm, chord changes, and melody are new.

Three of his studio albums have been listed among The 100 Greatest Slovak Albums of All Time, such as Lipa spieva Lasicu (2005), at number fifty-eight, ...v najlepších rokoch (2001), at number sixty-three, and Naspäť na stromy (1995), at number eighty-one. His album 68 (2012) peaked at number forty-eight on the Czech Albums Chart.

Discography

Studio albums
 1983: Neúprosné ráno (OPUS, #9115 1460; aka Moanin''')
 1987: Škrtni, co se nehodí (Supraphon, #1115 4206) with Luboš Andršt Blues Band
 1987: Je to stále tak (OPUS, #9315 1940; aka That's the Way It Is)
 1987: Peter Lipa a T+R Band with T+R Band (OPUS)
 1992: Svíčka a stín (Panton, #81 1223-2 331) with Eva Olmerová and Jana Koubková
 1995: Naspäť na stromy (East West Promotion, #1994-001) with Andrej Šeban, Juraj Griglák, Juraj Bartoš and Gabo Jonáš
 1998: Čierny Peter (BMG Ariola) with Andrej Šeban, Juraj Tatár, Gašpar and Marcel Buntaj
 2001: ...v najlepších rokoch (Millennium Records & Publishing, #834 006)
 2005: Lipa spieva Lasicu (Platinum, number #11 on the CZ Top 50 Prodejní.)
 2005: Jana Kirschner, Peter Lipa, Boboš Procházka with Jana Kirschner and Boboš Procházka
 2012: 68 (number #48 on the CZ Top 50 Prodejní.)

Export and English albums
 1984: Moanin (OPUS, #9115 1461)
 1988: That's the Way It Is (OPUS, #9313 1988)
 1988: Blues Office (Supraphon, #1115 4255) with Luboš Andršt Blues Band
 1995: Up to date with T+R Band
 1997: Boogie Up (PolyGram / EmArcy) with Peter Breiner
 2000: Bistro (BMG Ariola) with Band
 2003: Beatles in Blue(s)

Live albums
 1984: Blues z lipového dřeva (Supraphon, #1115 3109) with Luboš Andršt Blues Band

Notes

Awards
Notes
 A  The award credited to Andrej Šeban and shared with another album produced by himself, Part I by Made 2 Mate.
 B  The award credited to Gratex company.
 C  The award credited to Adnan Hamzić.
 D  The award shared with Juraj Tatár, Martin Gašpar and Peter Lipa Jr.
 E  The award credited to Ľuboš Války a Juraj Kupec. 
 F  The award credited to Marek Ormandík.
 G'''  Ľudovít Štúr Order denotes a state decoration, bestowed by the president of the country.

See also

 Slovak popular music
 The 100 Greatest Slovak Albums of All Time
 Honorific nicknames in popular music

References
General

 
 
 

Specific

Bibliography

Further reading

External links

Peter Lipa at Muzikus.cz
Peter Lipa at SuperMusic.sk

1943 births
Living people
Musicians from Prešov
Slovak jazz musicians
21st-century Slovak male singers
Slovak composers
Male composers
20th-century jazz composers
20th-century Slovak male singers
21st-century jazz composers
Male jazz composers
Czechoslovak male singers
Slovak male musicians